Soggadu is a 1975 Indian Telugu-language drama film directed by K. Bapayya and produced by D. Ramanaidu under Suresh Productions. The film stars Sobhan Babu as the title character alongside Jayachitra and Jayasudha. Anjali Devi, Kaikala Satyanarayana, Raja Babu, Allu Ramalingaiah, Santha Kumari, and Nagesh play supporting roles. Released on 19 December 1975, the film was a big commercial success. It was remade in Hindi as Dildaar (1977).

Plot
Sobhanadri is popularly known as 'Soggadu' in his native village. He loves his cross-cousin Saroja. Saroja's father Paramesam does not like this as he wants Saroja to be married to a well-educated individual. Sobhanadri challenges Paramesam that he will marry an educated girl. He leaves to the town, where he meets Saroja's classmate Latha. Latha has run away to escape from a forced marriage with her uncle Bhupathi. Latha and Sobhanadri get married in a hotel. Bhupathi files a case against Sobhanadri. Finally Sobhanadri and Latha reunite happily.

Cast

Awards
 Sobhan Babu won third consecutive Filmfare Best Actor Award (Telugu) for portraying role of Soggadu.
 D. Rama Naidu won Filmfare Best Film Award (Telugu).

Soundtrack
 "Avvaa Buvvaa Kaavaalante Ayyedenaa Abbaayii" (Lyrics: Aathreya; Singers: P. Susheela, S. P. Balasubrahmanyam ; Cast: Sobhan Babu, Jayasudha)
 "Chali Vestondi, Champestondi, Korikestondi" (Lyrics: Aathreya; Singers: P. Susheela, S. P. Balasubrahmanyam; Cast: Sobhan Babu, Jayasudha)
 "Edukondalavaadaa, Venkatesaa, Orayyo, Entapani Chesaavu, Tirumalesaa" (Lyrics: Aathreya; Singers: P. Susheela, S. P. Balasubrahmanyam; Cast: Sobhan Babu, Jayachitra)
 "Edukondalavaadaa, Venaktesaa, Orayyo, Entapani Chesaavu, Tirumalesaa!" (Pathos) (Lyrics: Aathreya; Singers: P. Susheela, S. P. Balasubrahmanyam; Cast: Sobhan Babu, Jayachitra)
 "Ole Ole, Olammii Uffantene Ulikkipaddaavu" (Lyrics: Aathreya; Singers: P. Susheela, S. P. Balasubrahmanyam; Cast: Sobhan Babu, Jayachitra)
 "Soggaadu Lechaadu, Choochi Choochi Nee Dummu Leputaadu!" (Lyrics: Aathreya; Singers: P. Susheela, S. P. Balasubrahmanyam; Cast: Sobhan Babu, Manjubhargavi, Jayachitra, Jayasudha)

Box office
The film ran for more than 100 days in 17 centres in Andhra Pradesh.

References

External links
 

1970s Telugu-language films
1975 films
Films directed by K. Bapayya
Films scored by K. V. Mahadevan
Indian drama films
Suresh Productions films
Telugu films remade in other languages